The Bibi-binary system for numeric notation (in French système Bibi-binaire, or abbreviated "système Bibi") is a hexadecimal numeral system first described in 1968 by singer/mathematician Robert "Boby" Lapointe (1922–1972).  At the time, it attracted the attention of André Lichnerowicz, then engaged in studies at the University of Lyon.  It found some use in a variety of unforeseen applications: stochastic poetry, stochastic art, colour classification, aleatory music, architectural symbolism, etc.

The notational system directly and logically encodes the binary representations of the digits in a hexadecimal (base sixteen) numeral.  In place of the Arabic numerals 0–9 and letters A–F currently used in writing hexadecimal numerals, it presents sixteen newly devised symbols (thus evading any risk of confusion with the decimal system).  The graphical and phonetic conception of these symbols is meant to render the use of the Bibi-binary "language" simple and fast.

The description of the language first appeared in Les Cerveaux non-humains ("Non-human brains"), and the system can also be found in Boby Lapointe by Huguette Long Lapointe.

Why Bibi 

The central observation driving this system is that sixteen can be written as 2 to the power of 2, to the power of 2.  As we use the term binary for numbers written in base two, Lapointe reasoned that one could also say "bi-binary" for base four, and thus "bibi-binary" for base 16.  Its name may also be a pun, as the word bibi in French is slang for "me" or "myself"; various forms of word play were at the centre of Lapointe's artistic œuvre.

Pronunciation 

In addition to unique graphical representations, Lapointe also devised a pronunciation for each of the sixteen digits.  Using four consonants (HBKD) and four vowels (OAEI), one obtains sixteen combinations:

HO, HA, HE, HI, BO, BA, BE, BI, KO, KA, KE, KI, DO, DA, DE, DI.

To express any number, it suffices to enumerate the (hexadecimal) digits that make it up.  For example: the number written as "2000" in base ten, which translates to "7D0" in conventionally-written hexadecimal, would in Bibi-binary be spoken aloud as "BIDAHO".

Negative numbers 

Contrary to the numeric conventions used in modern computers, the bibi-binary system represents negative numbers using one's complement, rather than two's complement.  Thus:
 +7 is written 0 0111
 −7 is written 1 1000
and their sum is written as "1 1111" (one of two representations of zero in this system; zero can also be written as "0 0000").

On modern machines, in classic binary notation, −7 would be written 1 1001, and the sum of −7 and 7 would give "0 0000"; this "two's complement" system thus needs only a single representation for the number zero.

References

External links 

 Conversion en ligne décimal ↔ bibi-binaire (in French)

Hexadecimal numeral system
Positional numeral systems